Pablo Javier Campodónico (born 17 October 1977) is an Argentine professional footballer who plays as a goalkeeper for Primera B Metropolitana club UAI Urquiza. He is the brother of former footballer Mariano Campodónico.

Career

Club
Campodónico began his career in 1997 with Temperley, with whom he stayed with for six years before joining Sarmiento in 2003 but only to return to Temperley two years later; however, he did win the 2003–04 Primera B Metropolitana while with Sarmiento. In 2004, Pablo conceded two goals in one match against his brother Mariano who describes it as "the worst thing that's happened to me in my football career". Pablo and his brother later played together for Aldosivi when Mariano was with the club in 2009. In 2006, Campodónico left Temperley again as he agreed to join Platense. After a season with the club he departed to join Aldosivi. As of the end of the 2016 season he has made 286 league appearances for Aldosivi.

Coaching career
After retiring at the age of 41, Campodónico began as a goalkeeper coach at Aldosivi, where he trained the women's teams. Alongside that, he also ran a mini-academy, where he trained young goalkeepers.

When Israel Damonte was appointed manager of Huracán on 3 January 2020, Campodónico also joined the club as a goalkeeper coach, alongside his brother, Mariano Campodónico, who was appointed assistant coach. They left in March 2021

Career statistics

Club
.

Honours

Club
Sarmiento
 Primera B Metropolitana (1): 2003–04

References

External links
 
 

1977 births
Living people
Footballers from Buenos Aires
Argentine footballers
Association football goalkeepers
Argentine expatriate footballers
Aldosivi footballers
Club Atlético Platense footballers
Club Atlético Temperley footballers
Club Atlético Sarmiento footballers
UAI Urquiza players
Argentine Primera División players
Primera Nacional players